The Philippines is one of the world's top producers of geothermal power, owing to its location along the Ring of Fire zone of Pacific volcanoes. The country commissioned the 12-megawatt Maibarara Geothermal Power Plant-2 on March 9, 2018, in Santo Tomas, Batangas.

The Geothermal Education Office and a 1980 article titled "The Philippines geothermal success story" by Rudolph J. Birsic published in the journal Geothermal Energy note the remarkable geothermal resources of the Philippines. During the World Geothermal Congress 2000 held in Beppu, Ōita Prefecture of Japan held from May to June 2000, it was reported that the Philippines is the largest consumer of electricity from geothermal sources and highlighted the potential role of geothermal energy in providing energy needs for developing countries.

According to the International Geothermal Association (IGA), worldwide, the Philippines ranks second to the United States in producing geothermal energy. As of 2010, the US had a capacity of 3093 megawatts of geothermal power, while that of the Philippines was 1904 megawatts. The Philippines was followed by Mexico with 958 MW. Early statistics from the Institute for Green Resources and Environment stated that Philippine geothermal energy provides 16% of the country's electricity. By 2005, geothermal energy accounted for 17.5% of the country's electricity production. More recent statistics from the IGA show that combined energy from the nation's six geothermal fields, located in the islands of Luzon, Leyte, Negros and Mindanao, still accounts for approximately 17% of the country's electricity generation. Leyte island is where the first geothermal power plant, a 3 megawatt wellhead unit, started operations in July 1977. Larger-scale commercial production of geothermal power began in 1979 with the commissioning of a 110-megawatt plant at Tiwi field in Albay province. IGA figures  as of December 2009 show the nation's installed geothermal capacity stands at 1904 megawatts, with gross generation of 10,311 gigawatt-hrs for all of 2009, representing 17% of the nation's total power generation mix.

As of 2017, the International Renewable Energy Agency estimates the Philippines' net installed geothermal energy capacity to at 1.9 gigawatts (GW)—out of the global geothermal installed capacity of 12.7 GW ranking behind the United States (2.5 GW) and ahead of Indonesia (1.5 GW). It also estimates that the country can potentially generate 2.1 GW from geothermal sources by 2025.

See also
Renewable energy in the Philippines
Wind power in the Philippines
List of Geothermal power plants in the Philippines

References